Taiwang may refer to:

Taiwang, Jilin, a town in Ji'an, Jilin, China
King Tai of Zhou or Taiwang of Zhou ( 12th century BC?), a leader of predynastic Zhou

See also
Taiwan
Taewang, Korean equivalent of "Taiwang"